Avinyonet del Penedès is a municipality in the comarca of the Alt Penedès in Catalonia, Spain. It is situated in the south-east of the comarca, and is served by the N-340 road between Barcelona and Tarragona. The ajuntament (town hall) is in Les Cabòries. The romanesque 
Benedictine monastery of Sant Sebastià dels Gorgs has been partially restored.

Demography

References

 Panareda Clopés, Josep Maria; Rios Calvet, Jaume; Rabella Vives, Josep Maria (1989). Guia de Catalunya, Barcelona: Caixa de Catalunya.  (Spanish).  (Catalan).

External links 
Official website 
 Government data pages 

Municipalities in Alt Penedès
Populated places in Alt Penedès